Violet is a 2005 opera by Roger Scruton about Violet Gordon-Woodhouse, a British keyboard player. It is the second of Scruton's two operas. He wrote words and music. 
Scruton said that the opera "tells the remarkable story of this woman who lived with four men – it was a story about the history of music, the history of England, about sex, and the difference between the old culture of sex and the new one, and how it all came together in the life of this peculiar woman". The two-act opera was given the first of two performances on 30 November 2005 at Guildhall School of Music and Drama in London, directed by Tess Gibbs and conducted by Clive Timms.

Background
The opera is based on the life of the harpsichordist Violet Gordon-Woodhouse. 
Violet is described in Grove Music Online as follows: "A woman of wealth and social standing (somewhat imperilled by her irregular private life), she did not lead a very active public professional life, but made a considerable impression on the intellectual and artistic circles of the day".
An important source for the libretto is the biography of Violet by her great-niece, Jessica Douglas-Home (Douglas-Home, Jessica, "Violet : The Life and Loves of Violet Gordon Woodhouse", 1997). Jessica appears as a character in the opera.

Scruton was largely self-taught as a composer, and is better known as a philosopher and writer. Violet is the second of Scruton's two operas – it was preceded by the one-act The Minister (1998). According to The Times critic Hilary Finch, Scruton's first opera was influenced by Benjamin Britten, whereas according to a review by David Conway, Violet is influenced by Leoš Janáček, a composer whom Scruton was known to admire. The score includes a number of references to music of other composers (including Bach, Mozart and Wagner), as well as to folksong.

The composer has written "In Violet’s world high culture, eccentric life-style, and aristocratic manners achieved a never-to-be-repeated synthesis. And when that world was swept away by the First World War, a part of the English soul was lost". According to the programme note of the premiere performance, Violet epitomises "the sad magnificence of human folly".
 
The cast of the opera includes Violet, her husband Gordon (with whom she had a mariage blanc) and a circle of relatives and friends including the lesbian composer Ethel Smyth (whose role is sung by a baritone) and three of Violet's male admirers.

Roles

Synopsis
The opera is set in the Gloucestershire home of the Woodhouses, Nether Lypiatt Manor. Jessica (in the present day), reading her great-aunt's papers, recreates the Edwardian world of Violet and her 'husbands' – Gordon, Max Labouchere, Bill Barrington (later 10th Viscount Barrington), Dennis Tollemache and Ethel. In real life, the ménage appears not to have been sexless, but according to the composer/librettist, Violet had a dream in which "love means purity and passion stops at the garden gate". 

The characters extol Violet and dine together. In the second act we learn that Max has died in the trenches in World War I.
Jessica, mourning what she sees as the loss of an innocent world, decides to sell the house.

ReferencesNotesSources'''
Conway, David (2005). "Violetta for Me – Roger Scruton's Violet at the Guildhall School of Music" in Social Affairs Unit website, accessed 25 January 2015.
 Dehn, Georgia (2012). "World of Roger Scruton, writer and philosopher", Daily Telegraph 27 January 2012, accessed 26 January 2015.
Salter, Lionel (n.d.). "Gordon Woodhouse (née Gwynne), Violet (Kate)" in Grove Music Online , accessed 25 January 2015.
Scruton, Roger (2013). "Violet – an opera by Roger Scruton" in Clarion Review'' 23 March 2013, accessed 25 January 2015. With the libretto, a recording of the debut, and an introductory essay by the composer.
Scruton, Roger (n.d.). "Music" on Roger Scruton website, accessed 25 January 2015.
 Scruton, Roger Sir Roger Scruton website, accessed 20 October 2018

Operas
2005 operas
English-language operas
Operas set in England
Operas by Roger Scruton
Operas set in the 20th century
Operas based on real people
Cultural depictions of classical musicians
Cultural depictions of British women
Guildhall School of Music and Drama